Jack McCullough may refer to:

 Jack McCullough (politician) (1860–1947), New Zealand trade unionist and politician
 Jack McCullough, formerly convicted of the murder of Maria Ridulph, but conviction was later overturned
 Jack McCullough (cyclist) (born 1949), Canadian cyclist
 Jack McCullough (rugby league) (1921–2005), Australian rugby player